{{Infobox horseraces
|class      = Group 3
|horse race = Pride Stakes
|image      = 
|caption    = 
|location   = Rowley MileNewmarket, England
|inaugurated = 
|race type  = Flat / Thoroughbred
|sponsor    = Newmarket Pony Academy
|website    = Newmarket
|distance   = 1m 2f (2,012 metres)
|surface    = Turf
|track      = Straight
|qualification = Three-years-old and upfillies and mares
|weight     = 8 st 13 lb (3yo);9 st 3 lb (4yo+)<small>Penalties7 lb for Group 1 winners *5 lb for Group 2 winners *3 lb for Group 3 winners ** since 31 March</small>
|purse      = £80,000 (2021)1st: £45,368
|bonuses    = 
}}

|}

The Pride Stakes is a Group 3 flat horse race in Great Britain open to mares and fillies aged three years or older.
It is run at Newmarket over a distance of 1 mile 2 furlongs (2,012 metres), and it is scheduled to take place each year in October.

Prior to 2013 the race was known as the Severals Stakes and was first run in 1998. It was previously contested at Listed level before being upgraded to Group 3 level from the 2019 running. The name Pride Stakes has also been used for a fillies' and mares' race originally run at Ascot as the Princess Royal Stakes. This race was later moved to Newmarket and renamed the Pride Stakes, before returning to Ascot as the British Champions Fillies and Mares Stakes.

Records

Most successful horse (2 wins):
 Chain Of Daisies – 2015, 2017Leading jockey (6 wins):
 Frankie Dettori – Sundrop (2004), Portrayal (2005), Short Skirt (2007), Modeyra (2010), Scottish Jig (2018), Fanny Logan (2019)Leading trainer (5 wins):
 Barry Hills – Sundrop (2004), Portrayal (2005), Short Skirt (2007), Modeyra (2010), Albasharah (2014)''

Winners

See also
 Horse racing in Great Britain
 List of British flat horse races

References
 
Racing Post:

Flat races in Great Britain
Newmarket Racecourse
Middle distance horse races for fillies and mares
1998 establishments in England
Recurring sporting events established in 1998